The 1992–93 Rider Broncs men's basketball team represented Rider University in the 1992–93 NCAA Division I men's basketball season. The Broncs, led by head coach Kevin Bannon, played their home games at the Alumni Gymnasium in Lawrenceville, New Jersey as members of the Northeast Conference. They finished the season 19–11, 14–4 in NEC play to finish atop the conference standings. In the NEC tournament, they defeated No. 9 seed , No. 5 seed , and No. 2 seed  to win the tournament and earn an automatic bid to the NCAA tournament. As the No. 16 seed in the Southeast region of the 1993 NCAA tournament, the Broncs were defeated by No. 1 seed and eventual Final Four participant Kentucky, 96–52, in the opening round.

Roster

Schedule and results 

|-
!colspan=12 style=| Regular season

|-
!colspan=12 style=| NEC tournament

|-
!colspan=12 style=| NCAA tournament

Sources

References

Rider Broncs men's basketball seasons
Rider Broncs
Rider
Rider Broncs men's basketball
Rider Broncs men's basketball